The Makrani Baloch of Rajasthan are descendants of Baloch soldiers who were brought as mercenaries. They are still distributed in the former princely states of Marwar, Godwad, and Jodhpur.

History
These Baloch soldiers came from the Makran region of Balochistan. They now speak Marwari (Rajasthani), while some Makrani also have knowledge of Urdu. They are one of three communities found in Rajasthan that claim to have originated in Balochistan. The Makrani are now distinct from the Rind, Lashari Kurds, and Korai; other Baloch communities found in Rajasthan. While in Pakistan, the term Makrani now tends to be used as a synonym for the African-descended Siddi people of Makran, the Rajasthani Makrani have no connection with the Siddi community.

See also
 Bhagnari

External links

Rajasthan
Muslim communities of Rajasthan